Iran Tractor Manufacturing Company also known as ITMCO, is a manufacturer of tractors, trucks, auto-parts, and diesel engines with main site and headquarters in Tabriz, Iran. ITMCO is enlisted in the 100 fortune companies of Iran. Tractor Manufacturing Company owned Tractor sport club since 1968 to 2011.

History and development
Based on an agreement that was reached in 1966 between Iran and Romania to establish a tractor manufacturing company in Iran, the company was created in Tabriz in 1968. The first goal of the company was to manufacture 10,000 units tractors of 45-65 horsepower engines with single and double differential gearboxes. In 1976 Massey Ferguson started to assemble tractors in the company with the rate of 13000 units for each year. At the moment the production capacity has been increased up to 30000 units for each year. On 1987 the factory started to increase its foundry capacity to be able to produce casting products for different industries. Nowadays it has the largest foundry capacity among middle east. In 1990s The factory started to produce small trucks and vans behind its main products.

As of 2021, ITMC has 12 subsidiaries which contract out many tasks to 800 domestic parts manufacturers employing 200,000 people. ITMC also builds engines for various machines, including graders, compressors, water pumps, generators, forklifts, combine harvesters and road construction vehicles. ITMC makes 90% of the parts inside of Iran.

Certifications
Iran Tractor Manufacturing Company has qualified for ISO 9001, and has also received rewards regarding quality and exporting.

Export markets
Iran Tractor Manufacturing Company is currently exporting 13 different products to ten countries, including Europe.

See also
Industry of Iran
IDRO Group
Privatization in Iran
List of Iranian companies
Agriculture in Iran
National Enterprise Corporation

References

External links
 http://investing.businessweek.com/research/stocks/private/snapshot.asp?privcapId=21923234
 http://www.zawya.com/story.cfm/sidZAWYA20100407034651/Iran%20Tractor%20Manufacturing%20Company%20to%20go%20public

Iranian brands
Manufacturing companies established in 1968
Companies listed on the Tehran Stock Exchange
Economy of Iranian Azerbaijan
Diesel engine manufacturers
Engine manufacturers of Iran
Iranian entities subject to the U.S. Department of the Treasury sanctions
Agriculture companies of Iran